Alexandr Fedorov (born 6 May 1978) is an IFBB professional bodybuilder.

Fedorov earned his IFBB Pro Card after winning the 2003 IFBB European Amateur Championships. After competing in various Russian and other European professional bodybuilding competitions in 2003 and 2004 where he earned two top 3 finishes, including runner up to Ronnie Coleman at the 2004 Grand Prix Russia, Alexander qualified for the 2005 Mr. Olympia, where he did not place.  He also competed in the 2006 New York Pro, but did not place either.

During this time Fedorov was dealing with a torn pectoral muscle – an injury from September 2003 which would eventually force him to temporarily retire from bodybuilding.

Since 2014 Alexander is back to professional bodybuilding and is actively training now.

Alexander currently resides in Russia with his wife Natalia, his daughter Veronica and his two young baby-twins.

Competitive History
2003 European Amateur Championships, Super-HeavyWeight, 1st
2003 Grand Prix Russia, 3rd
2004 Grand Prix Russia, 2nd
2005 Mr. Olympia, Did not place
2006 New York Pro Championships, Did not place
2006 Grand Prix Austria, 10th
2014 Grand Prix Fitness House Pro, 8th
2015 Arnold Classic Europe, 12th
2015 Nordic Pro, 11th
2015 Orlando Pro Europa, 3rd

External links
BodyBuilder Webmagazin entry 
Muscle and Fitness article
Official website

See also
List of male professional bodybuilders

References

Russian bodybuilders
Living people
1978 births
Professional bodybuilders